Olavi Lanu, (10 July 1925 Viipurin maalaiskunta (former municipality of Finland) – 11 May 2015 Lahti) was a Finnish sculptor.

He took part to Venice Biennale in 1978 and had more publicity. Lanu's sculptures can be see example in Lanu-puisto. He used to use many kind of materials like wood, copper and concrete, but tried to make surface to mimic natural forms, example moss, bark and sand.

Olavi Lanu has also made so called land art.

Some works

Elämää suomalaismetsässä (1978)
Kaari
Keko
Lehmus
Rankakasa
The three stones (1985)

References

1925 births
2015 deaths
20th-century Finnish sculptors
21st-century Finnish sculptors